Iota Ceti (ι Cet, ι Ceti) is the Bayer designation for a star system in the equatorial  constellation of Cetus. It has the traditional name Deneb Kaitos Shemali. The name was from the Arabic word ذنب قيطس الشمالي - dhanab qayṭas al-shamālī, meaning the northern tail of the sea monster. it is visible to the naked eye with an apparent visual magnitude of 3.562. Based upon an annual parallax shift of 11.88 mas, it lies around 275 light years from the Sun.

This is an MK-standard star with a stellar classification of K1.5 III, indicating that it is an evolved K-type giant star. However, Houk and Swift (1999) list a classification of K1 II, which would indicate this is a bright giant. It is a suspected variable with a visual amplitude of around 0.05 magnitude. The star has about 2.8 times the mass of the Sun, 34 times the Sun's radius, and radiates 398 times the solar luminosity from its outer atmosphere at an effective temperature of 4,446 K.

Iota Ceti forms a wide astrometric pair with a common proper motion companion, a magnitude 10.40 star at an angular separation of 106.4 arcseconds along a position angle of 191° (as of 2014). This companion may be a K-type star.

References

K-type giants
Cetus (constellation)
Ceti, Iota
Deneb Kaitos Shemali
Ceti, 08
BD-09 48
001562
001522
0074